The Women's Uni 7s Series is the peak domestic competition for women's rugby sevens in Australia. The series is run by UniSport and Rugby Australia. It is contested by university teams and half of each team's playing squad must be student-athletes. Members of the national women's squad are also allocated to each team. The series was sponsored by Aon from 2017 to 2019.

Champions

All-time summary
As of the 2022 Uni 7s Series.

References

External links
Women’s Uni 7s Series (UniSport)
Women’s Uni 7s Series (Rugby Australia)

2017 establishments in Australia
Recurring sporting events established in 2017
Rugby
Rugby sevens competitions in Australia
Women's rugby sevens competitions